Xinjiang Begonia F.C. (Simplified Chinese: 新疆海棠足球俱乐部) is a football club. They currently compete in the China League Two.

History

Xinjiang Begonia was found in February 2012 by Xiyu Group and Xinjiang Zhaori Group. The team kicked off its career within China League Two, the third tier league of the chinese football league system, during the 2012 league season. The team started off the season with a great 5-game undefeated start, winning three and tied two without letting in one goal. However, they failed to finish within the top four of the north group, and ended up fifth, missing both the playoffs and the chance of advancing to China League One.

The team will not compete in the 2013 season. However, with the decent start to the league the team was able to pull off, the team hopes to achieve China League One in the near future, and hopefully China Super League to potentially promote football in Xinjiang.

All-time league rankings

 in North Group

Staff

References

External links
Official site 

Defunct football clubs in China

Football clubs in China